Carlos Miguel Prieto (born 14 November 1965) is a Mexican conductor.   He is music director of the Orquesta Sinfonica Nacional de Mexico and the Orquesta Sinfonica de Mineria, of the Louisiana Philharmonic Orchestra in New Orleans, and The Orchestra of the Americas in Washington, D.C..

Early life and education
Prieto grew up in a musical family, with a cellist father, Carlos Prieto.  His family formed the Cuarteto Prieto, with which he played violin.  His grandfather was on the board of Mexico's National Symphony Orchestra. At an early age, he began playing violin, and continued playing music throughout his youth, including during his subsequent university studies.  Prieto earned a degree in electrical engineering from Princeton.  In 1992, he earned a Master's of Business Administration at Harvard University.  He worked for a sugar company before devoting full-time to music as a career.

Prieto attended conducting courses at the Pierre Monteux School in Maine, and at the Tanglewood Music Center.  He has studied conducting with Jorge Mester, Enrique Diemecke, Charles Bruck and Michael Jinbo.

Career
Prieto made his made his professional debut with the Mexico City Philharmonic Orchestra in 1995, and served as its music director from 1998 to 2002.  In 2002, Prieto became Music Director of the Orquesta Sinfónica de Xalapa, a position he held until 2008.  Prieto was named Music Director of the Orquesta Sinfónica Nacional de Mexico in 2007.  He was appointed music director of the Orquesta Sinfónica de Minería in 2008, with which he founded the Mozart-Haydn Festival.

In the US, Prieto was assistant conductor of the Houston Symphony Orchestra from 2003 to 2006, and music director of the Huntsville Symphony Orchestra from 2003 to 2011.  Prieto became music director of the Louisiana Philharmonic Orchestra in 2005, one week before Hurricane Katrina hit New Orleans.  The orchestra has extended his contract as the orchestra's music director twice, in 2009 and in 2013, with his current contract set through the 2018-2019 season.  Prieto led the orchestra in its Carnegie Hall debut on February 27, 2018.

Prieto has been associated with the Orchestra of the Americas from its inception in 2002. He was named Principal Conductor that year, and served in that role until 2011, when he was appointed Music Director.  Prieto conducted over 100 world premieres of works by Mexican and American composers, many of which he commissioned.

In June 2021, the North Carolina Symphony Orchestra announced that Prieto will act as the Raleigh-based orchestra's Artistic Advisor for the 2021-22 season. On February 23, 2022, the NCS announced the appointment of Prieto as its next Music Director. His initial four-year term as Music Director begins with the 2023-2024 season, and he will serve as Music Director Designate during the 2022-2023 season.  

Prieto has recorded for the Urtext Records, Sony Classical, Naxos, and Avanticlassic labels.  For Urtext, he has made a series of recordings of Latin American and Mexican music.  In 2013, a 12-DVD set of Mahler's symphonies was released, with the Orquestra Sinfonica de Mineria conducted by Prieto.  In 2016, Gabriela Montero, Prieto and the YOA Orchestra of the Americas won the Best Classical Album award at the Latin Grammy Awards for a recording of music by Rachmaninov and Gabriela Montero.

Prieto's honours include the Order of Orange-Nassau (Grade of Officer), from the government of the Netherlands, 'Conductor of the Year 2002' from the Mexican Union of Music and Theatre Critics, and the Mozart Medal of Honor presented by the Government of Mexico and the Embassy of Austria in 1998.  In 2007, Prieto served as Mexico's delegate to the Davos World Economic Forum.  In October 2018, Musical America named Prieto its 2019 Conductor of the Year.

Prieto and his wife Isabel Mariscal, a former ballerina with the Mexican National Ballet, have three children.

References

External links
 Official website of Carlos Miguel Prieto
 Intermusica agency page on Carlos Miguel Prieto's page
 Louisiana Philharmonic Orchestra page on Carlos Miguel Prieto 
 AllMusic.com page on Carlos Miguel Prieto
 Latin Grammy Awards, 2015, page on 'Mejor Álbum de Música Clásica'
 'Conductor Carlos Miguel Prieto to Release 12 DVD Set & More'.  Broadway World, 26 April 2013

Living people
1965 births
Mexican conductors (music)
Male conductors (music)
Mexican classical violinists
Male classical violinists
Princeton University alumni
Harvard Business School alumni
National Conservatory of Music of Mexico alumni
21st-century conductors (music)
21st-century classical violinists
21st-century male musicians